Dermomurex bobyini is a species of sea snail, a marine gastropod mollusk in the family Muricidae, the murex snails or rock snails.

Description
The length of the shell varies between 20 mm and 46 mm.

Distribution
This marine species occurs off the Philippines.

References

External links
 

Dermomurex